Nigel Davies may refer to:

Nigel Davies (historian) (1920–2004), British historian and anthropologist
Justin de Villeneuve (Nigel Jonathan(?) Davies), British modelling agent and celebrity of the 1960s
Nigel Davies (chess player) (born 1960), English chess grandmaster
Nigel Davies (rugby union) (born 1965), Welsh rugby player and coach

See also
Nigel Twiston-Davies, British racehorse trainer